Pod Prąd ('Against the current') was a Polish weekly Marxist newspaper published between 1934 and 1936, issued by dissidents from the Communist Party of Poland that turned against the Soviet Union. The newspaper was founded by Andrzej Stawar. The other main figure in the Pod Prąd venture was Roman Jabłonowski. The newspaper was sold openly in the 1930s and wasn't confiscated.

Even though Pod Prad operated on the margins of the Communist Party, the publication had a profound influence over the intellectuals of the party.

References

1934 establishments in Poland
1936 disestablishments in Poland
Communism in Poland
Defunct newspapers published in Poland
Marxist newspapers
Weekly newspapers published in Poland
Polish-language newspapers
Publications established in 1934
Publications disestablished in 1936